Adil Rashshatovich Mukhametzyanov (born 15 March 1998) is a Russian football player.

Club career
He made his debut in the Russian Professional Football League for FC Anzhi-Yunior Zelenodolsk on 3 August 2017 in a game against FC Krylia Sovetov-2 Samara.

On 30 May 2019, his FC Rubin Kazan contract was dissolved by mutual consent.

He made his Russian Football National League debut for FC Tekstilshchik Ivanovo on 7 July 2019 in a game against FC Yenisey Krasnoyarsk.

References

External links
 
 Profile by Russian Professional Football League

1998 births
Living people
Russian footballers
FC Rubin Kazan players
FC Tekstilshchik Ivanovo players
Association football midfielders